1969 Georgia 500 may refer to:

 1969 Georgia 500 that took place on November 17, 1968
 1969 Georgia 500 that took place on November 9, 1969